CKGA is an AM radio station in Gander, Newfoundland and Labrador, Canada, broadcasting at 650 kHz. Owned by Stingray Group, CKGA first went on the air in 1969 at 730 kHz, but moved to 650 in 1988. It is an affiliate of VOCM.

In September 2016, VOCM network station CKCM in Grand Falls-Windsor cancelled their remaining local programming and now simulcast CKGA full-time.

External links 
 VOCM
 CKGA-AM history - Canadian Communication Foundation

KGA
KGA
KGA
Radio stations established in 1969
1969 establishments in Newfoundland and Labrador